Dictyna calcarata is a species of mesh web weaver in the spider family Dictynidae. It is found in the United States, Mexico, and has been introduced into Hawaii.

References

Dictynidae
Articles created by Qbugbot
Spiders described in 1904